Rittenhouse Square is a 2022 American drama film written and directed by Brandon Eric Kamin, starring Nick Nolte and Dharon Jones. The movie shares the story of two people, both on the path of self-destruction, who remedy dark times with friendship and music.

Cast
Nick Nolte as Barry
Dharon Jones as KJ
Lenny Steinline  as Bishop Harris

Production
Filming occurred in Rittenhouse Square in October 2021.

Release
The film premiered at the Philadelphia Film Festival on October 23, 2022.

References

External links
 

Films shot in Philadelphia
American drama films